A hover car is a personal vehicle that flies at a constant altitude of up to a few meters (yards) above the ground and used for personal transportation in the same way a modern automobile is employed. The concept usually appears in science fiction.

In science fiction, it is capable of elevating itself some distance from the ground through some repulsion technology, presumably exploiting some short range anti-gravity principle so as to eliminate most friction forces which act against conventional vehicles. Other works feature vehicles that hover by having magnetic plates lined along roads, operating in a similar principle to Maglev. The capability of hovering above the ground eliminates the need for tires, and unlike an air-cushion vehicle, it does not produce a dust cloud.

The closest devices are the hovercraft, which elevates itself above a water or level hard surface using a cushion of air retained by a flexible skirt, and the hovertrain, which is a type of high-speed train that replaces conventional steel wheels with hovercraft lift pads, and the conventional railway bed with a paved road-like surface, known as the "track" or "guideway".

Efforts to build air-cushion hover cars 

Air-cushion hover cars are hovercraft.

In April 1958, Ford engineers demonstrated the Glide-air, a  model of a wheelless vehicle that speeds on a thin film of air only 76.2 μm ( of an inch) above its table top roadbed. An article in Modern Mechanix quoted Andrew A. Kucher, Ford's vice president in charge of Engineering and Research noting "We look upon Glide-air as a new form of high-speed land transportation, probably in the field of rail surface travel, for fast trips of distances of up to about ".

In 1959, Ford displayed a hovercraft concept car, the Ford Levacar Mach I.

Efforts to build MagLev hover cars 
Ford also displayed a concept car, LEVICAR. It was a one-person, small in a modern sense, car propelled by maglev. The car was designed to be levitated by magnets, and was intended to be developed for high-speed transportation systems. The Levicar was very light and when raised off its guide rail by the magnetic it only required a blower in the back to propel it. A working model was actually built. While technically a success, the whole project was dropped due to financial constraints.

In popular culture

In science fiction films and television
Supercar (TV series)
The Jetsons
Futurama
 Rise and Fall of the Trigan Empire
Blade Runner saga (as Spinner)
A.I.
Minority Report
I, Robot
Star Trek saga (skimmers and desert fliers; the latter being a Vulcan hovercar)
Star Wars saga (as grav-cars, airflow cars, hover cars, trundle cars, hauler cars and landspeeders)
Total Recall
Agents of S.H.I.E.L.D.
Back to the Future Part II
Lilo & Stitch
The Fifth Element
 The Adventures of Jimmy Neutron: Boy Genius
 Altered Carbon
Stand by Me Doraemon
Space Precinct (as hoppers)
Tomorrowland
Immortal (2004 film) (unique type of hovercar, which is powered by overhead wires)
Robot Jox

In video games
TimeSplitters
F-Zero
Rock n' Roll Racing
Quarantine (1994 video game)|Quarantine
Quarantine II: Road Warrior (1995 video game)
Wipeout
Space Quest I
Beam Breakers
Fallout
Redout
Jak 2
 Saints Row 4
Overwatch
Does not Commute
Grand Theft Auto Online
BHunter
Aircar (video game)|Aircar
Hover!
Hover Ace
ReVOLUTION
Nikopol: Secrets of the Immortals
Cloudpunk (as HOVA)
Blade Runner (as Spinner)
NYR: New York Race (contains hovercars from The Fifth Element)

See also 
 Aero-X
 Flying car
 Hoverbike
 Hoverboard
 Hovercraft
 Hovertrain
 Maglev

References

Car